Repyevka or Repyovka is the name of several  rural localities in Russia.

Republic of Bashkortostan
As of 2010, two rural localities in the Republic of Bashkortostan bear this name:
Repyevka, Belebeyevsky District, Republic of Bashkortostan, a village in Tuzlukushevsky Selsoviet of Belebeyevsky District
Repyevka, Chishminsky District, Republic of Bashkortostan, a village in Ibragimovsky Selsoviet of Chishminsky District

Belgorod Oblast
As of 2010, one rural locality in Belgorod Oblast bears this name:
Repyevka, Belgorod Oblast, a selo in Repyevsky Rural Okrug of Volokonovsky District

Kursk Oblast
As of 2010, one rural locality in Kursk Oblast bears this name:
Repyevka, Kursk Oblast, a village in Pogozhensky Selsoviet of Timsky District

Republic of Mordovia
As of 2010, three rural localities in the Republic of Mordovia bear this name:
Repyevka, Chamzinsky District, Republic of Mordovia, a selo under the administrative jurisdiction of Chamzinka Work Settlement in Chamzinsky District
Repyevka, Ichalkovsky District, Republic of Mordovia, a village in Permeyevsky Selsoviet of Ichalkovsky District
Repyevka, Lyambirsky District, Republic of Mordovia, a selo in Salovsky Selsoviet of Lyambirsky District

Orenburg Oblast
As of 2010, one rural locality in Orenburg Oblast bears this name:
Repyevka, Orenburg Oblast, a selo in Repyevsky Selsoviet of Tyulgansky District

Oryol Oblast
As of 2010, one rural locality in Oryol Oblast bears this name:
Repyevka, Oryol Oblast, a village in Oktyabrsky Selsoviet of Maloarkhangelsky District

Penza Oblast
As of 2010, one rural locality in Penza Oblast bears this name:
Repyevka, Penza Oblast, a selo in Dolgorukovsky Selsoviet of Serdobsky District

Samara Oblast
As of 2010, one rural locality in Samara Oblast bears this name:
Repyevka, Samara Oblast, a selo in Kinel-Cherkassky District

Saratov Oblast
As of 2010, two rural localities in Saratov Oblast bear this name:
Repyevka, Bazarno-Karabulaksky District, Saratov Oblast, a selo in Bazarno-Karabulaksky District
Repyevka, Rtishchevsky District, Saratov Oblast, a selo in Rtishchevsky District

Tambov Oblast
As of 2010, one rural locality in Tambov Oblast bears this name:
Repyevka, Tambov Oblast, a settlement in Kalaissky Selsoviet of Kirsanovsky District

Republic of Tatarstan
As of 2010, one rural locality in the Republic of Tatarstan bears this name:
Repyevka, Republic of Tatarstan, a settlement in Kaybitsky District

Ulyanovsk Oblast
As of 2010, three rural localities in Ulyanovsk Oblast bear this name:
Repyevka, Inzensky District, Ulyanovsk Oblast, a selo in Cheremushkinsky Rural Okrug of Inzensky District
Repyevka (selo), Novospassky District, Ulyanovsk Oblast, a selo in Krasnoselsky Rural Okrug of Novospassky District
Repyevka (station), Novospassky District, Ulyanovsk Oblast, a station in Krasnoselsky Rural Okrug of Novospassky District

Voronezh Oblast
As of 2010, one rural locality in Voronezh Oblast bears this name:
Repyovka, Voronezh Oblast, a selo in Repyovskoye Rural Settlement of Repyovsky District